Nassarius crematus, common name the burned nassa, is a species of sea snail, a marine gastropod mollusc in the family Nassariidae, the Nassa mud snails or dog whelks. Nassarius crematus was first described by Richard Brinsley Hinds in 1844 on a voyage in the H.M.S. Sulphur.

Description
The length of the shell varies between 13 mm and 41 mm. The shell is round and bulbous, with four spires at its top. In many specimens, the outer lip is very large, and the palatal wall takes up most of its front.

Distribution
This species occurs in the Indian Ocean off Tanzania and the Mascarene Basin; in the Southwest Pacific, off the Philippines and New Guinea and off Japan. It has also been found off the coasts of Hawaii, China, Malaysia, and Thailand.

References

 Hinds, R.B.(1844-1845). Mollusca. In: The zoology of the voyage of H.M.S. "Sulphur", under the command of Captain Sir Edward Belcher during the years 1836-42. London: Smith, Elder and Co. v + 72 pp., 21 pls. [Pp. 1-24, pls. 1-7, July 1844; pp. 25-48, pl. 8-14, October 1844; p. i-v, 49-72, pl. 15-21, January 1845]. 
 Cernohorsky W. O. (1984). Systematics of the family Nassariidae (Mollusca: Gastropoda). Bulletin of the Auckland Institute and Museum 14: 1–356
 Drivas, J. & M. Jay (1988). Coquillages de La Réunion et de l'île Maurice
 Petit R.E. (2009) George Brettingham Sowerby, I, II & III: their conchological publications and molluscan taxa. Zootaxa 2189: 1–218.

External links
 https://collections.si.edu/search/results.htm?q=Zeuxis+crematus&tag.cstype=all

Nassariidae
Gastropods described in 1844